Self-Portrait as a Female Martyr is a painting by the Italian artist Artemisia Gentileschi. It was painted around 1613. It is currently in a private collection in the United States. An inscription on the reverse confirms that it is painted by Gentileschi. It is one of two paintings by Gentileschi painted with oil on wood.

Description
The artist depicts herself in the style of a martyr, as represented by the palm frond in her hand. The awkward proportion of the hand as compared to the head suggest that it may have been added at a later stage. It is unusual for the period in that it lacks the symbol of a specific saint, but does not appear to have been cut down in size.

History
The painting is believed to have been painted during the artist's time in Florence, based on both the appearance as well as some supplier records discovered in archives. The work is signed "Artemisia Lomi", the name she assumed while working in Florence to associate herself with her uncle Aurelio Lomi, who had already established a reputation there.

Provenance
The painting was in the collection of Ignazio Hugford, who lent it to an exhibition in Florence in the 1760s. It was later in the collection of Martha (Wollaston) Beavan from Leintwardine, Herefordshire, from which it was sold at Sotheby's London 9 December 1987.

References 

Paintings by Artemisia Gentileschi
1610s paintings
Self-portraits